Gordon Belgum Adam (May 26, 1915 – March 27, 1992) was an American rower, born in Seattle, an Olympic gold medallist at Berlin 1936.

Raised on a dairy farm in Everson, Washington, Adam took up rowing at the University of Washington. He rowed in UW senior varsity eights which won US national Intercollegiate Rowing Association titles in 1936 and 1937. At the 1936 Summer Olympics, he won the gold medal rowing in the three seat of the American boat in the men's eight competition.

A mechanical engineering graduate, Adam had a thirty-eight year career working for Boeing.

He died in Laguna Hills, California at age 76.

References

External links
 
 
 

1915 births
1992 deaths
Rowers from Seattle
Rowers at the 1936 Summer Olympics
Olympic gold medalists for the United States in rowing
American male rowers
Medalists at the 1936 Summer Olympics